The Industrial Bank Co., Ltd. is a commercial bank based in Fuzhou, Fujian province of the  People's Republic of China.

History
On 26 Aug. 1988, The State Council of China and the People's Bank of China approved the establishment of this bank. Its official name is Fujian Industrial Bank Joint-Stock Corporation, Limited (Chinese: 福建兴业银行股份有限公司), or abbreviated to Industrial Bank (China).[1]

On 3 March 2003, it was renamed "Industrial Bank Co., Ltd.". It announced the completion of the shareholding system transformation. It is one of the first joint-stock commercial banks approved by the State Council and the People's Bank of China.

On 5 February 2007, the Industrial Bank was listed on the Shanghai Stock Exchange (Stock Code: 601166) with capital of RMB 10.786 billion.

In March 2012, the Industrial Bank's total assets reached RMB 2,629,398 million, shareholders' equity amounted to RMB 123,957 million, net profit for the first quarter was RMB 8,288 million, and NPL ratio was 0.40%. According to the "Top 1000 World Banks" released by the British Magazine The Banker in 2011, the Industrial Bank ranked 75th in total assets and 83rd in tier 1 capital. The Industrial Bank opened 79 branches and 662 sub-branches.

The Industrial Bank has a fully owned subsidiary, Industrial Financial Leasing Co., Ltd., and a controlling stake in Union Trust Co., Ltd. Headquarters-level operating units such as Financial Markets Center, Credit Card Center, Retail Banking Headquarters, Private Banking Department, Assets Custody Department, Bank Services Center, VIC (Very Important Clients) Department, Investment Banking Department, Futures Finance Department, Funds Finance Department, Trade Finance Center and Sustainable Finance Center operate in Shanghai and Beijing.

Business Activities

The main business activities of the Industrial Bank are:

Personal Banking
Taking deposits.
Lending.
Local and international payments and settlements.
Safety deposit box service.
Credit cards.

Corporate Banking
Bills acceptance and discounting.
Issuing of financial bonds.
Provision of letters of credit and guarantee facilities.
Insurance sales.
Collections of payments.
Bank card business.

Institutional Banking
Agency issuing, cashing and underwriting of government bonds.
Purchase and sales of government bonds and financial bonds.
Inter-bank placements and borrowings services.
Agency service in trading of foreign currencies.
Settlements and sales of foreign currencies.

Ownership Structure

As of 5 February 2007, the top ten shareholders in the bank were:

References

External links 

Banks of China
Government-owned companies of China
Companies listed on the Shanghai Stock Exchange
Companies in the CSI 100 Index
Companies based in Fuzhou
Banks established in 1988
Chinese brands